The Bornean water shrew (Chimarrogale phaeura) is a species of mammal in the family Soricidae. It is endemic to Malaysia. Its natural habitat is rivers.

References

 

Chimarrogale
Endemic fauna of Malaysia
Endemic fauna of Borneo
Mammals of Malaysia
Mammals of Borneo
Taxonomy articles created by Polbot
Mammals described in 1898
Taxa named by Oldfield Thomas